Angelo Cannavacciuolo (born July 17, 1956 in Naples) is an Italian writer and director.

Cannavacciuolo was born in Naples.  He studied Arabic at the Oriental Institute. Originally a successful actor, he also wrote and directed plays before going on to make his first feature film Malesh (1993). It starred Ida Di Benedetto, Marina Suma and Emilio Bonucci. In 1999, he published his first novel Guardiani delle Nuvole which was nominated for the Premio Viareggio and the Premio Giuseppe Berto. It was later turned into a movie by Luciano Odorisio. Cannavacciuolo's second book Il soffio delle Fate was nominated for the Premio Elsa Morante. His fourth novel Le cose accadono met with greater success, winning the Premio Viadana and the Premio Domenico Rea. Apart from novels, he has also written numerous short stories. His latest novel SacrAmerica is due to be released soon.

References

1956 births
20th-century Italian writers
20th-century Italian male writers
21st-century Italian writers
21st-century Italian male writers
Italian screenwriters
Living people
Writers from Naples
Italian male screenwriters
Film people from Naples